Miceștii de Câmpie is a commune in Bistrița-Năsăud County, Transylvania, Romania. It is composed of three villages: Fântânița (Mezőköbölkút), Miceștii de Câmpie and Visuia (Mezőviszolya).

References

Communes in Bistrița-Năsăud County
Localities in Transylvania